Sillhovet is a city block in central Stockholm. It lies on Blasieholmen close to the National museum and was built in the 1700s.

References

Geography of Stockholm